Cai Yun (born 19 January 1980) is a former professional badminton player representing China. He is the 2012 London Olympic gold medallist and a four-time World Champion in men's doubles. He is regarded as one of the greatest men's doubles player of all time.

Sport career
Combining Cai Yun's impressive speed with his regular partner Fu Haifeng's impressive power, Cai and Fu have been one of the world's leading men's doubles teams since 2004. They have won numerous top tier events on the world circuit including the venerable All England Open Championships in 2005 and 2009.  They have won the BWF World Championships 4 times in 2006, 2009, 2010 and 2011, becoming the first Men's Doubles pair to achieve this feat. Cai and Fu have helped China win five consecutive Thomas Cup (Men's Team World Badminton Championships) (2004, 2006, 2008, 2010, and 2012) and six consecutive Sudirman Cup (World Team Championships) (2005, 2007, 2009, 2011, 2013 and 2015). Cai and Fu also competed together in the Olympic games 3 times, including the 2004, the 2008 Olympic Games and the 2012 Olympic Games. They were eliminated in the quarterfinals in 2004, and in 2008 in Beijing were silver medalists, losing a close final to Indonesia's Markis Kido and Hendra Setiawan.

At the 2010 BWF World Championships, they, being the fifth-seed, beat the third-seed Danish pair Mathias Boe and Carsten Mogensen 21–11, 21–18 in the quarterfinals. In the semifinals, they defeated the second-seed Indonesian Olympic Champions Markis Kido and Hendra Setiawan 21–16, 21–13. In the finals, they overcame the first-seed and Malaysian world no. 1 Koo Kien Keat and Tan Boon Heong 18–21, 21–18, 21–14 to win the world title for the 3rd time. They are the first Men's Doubles pair to achieve this feat.

Cai and Fu went on to win the Li-Ning China Masters Super Series. Being the fifth-seed, they first defeated their second-seed compatriots Xu Chen and Guo Zhendong 21–11, 21–16 in the quarterfinals. In the semifinals, they made a great comeback against the third-seed South Korean rival Lee Yong-dae and Jung Jae-sung 20–22, 21–13, 21–17. Cai and Fu then clinched their second China Masters title by defeating the fourth-seed South Korean pair Yoo Yeon-seong and Ko Sung-hyun in 2 sets 21–14, 21–19. Cai and Fu won their third title in a row by winning the Yonex Japan Open Super Series. They, being the fifth-seed, beat the young Korean Pair Cho Gun-woo and Kwon Yi-goo 21–14, 16–21, 21–12 in the quarterfinals. In the semifinals, they defeated their promising compatriots Zhang Nan and Chai Biao 21–17, 21–16. In the finals, they made a great comeback again against the first-seed and Malaysian world no. 1 Koo Kien Keat and Tan Boon Heong 18–21, 21–14, 21–12 to win their first Japan Open title.

In the 2012 Summer Olympics, they defeated Denmark's Mathias Boe and Carsten Mogensen in the final to win the gold medal.

Having won 1 Olympic gold medal and 4 World Championship titles, as well as many other titles, Cai and Fu is one of the most successful men's doubles pairs in badminton history. They have expressed the will to continue their career together as long as they can after the London Olympics.

Achievements

Olympic Games 
Men's doubles

BWF World Championships 
Men's doubles

World Cup 
Men's doubles

Asian Championships 
Men's doubles

World Junior Championships 
Boys' doubles

Mixed doubles

Asian Junior Championships 
Boys' doubles

BWF Superseries 
The BWF Superseries, which was launched on 14 December 2006 and implemented in 2007, was a series of elite badminton tournaments, sanctioned by the Badminton World Federation (BWF). BWF Superseries levels were Superseries and Superseries Premier. A season of Superseries consisted of twelve tournaments around the world that had been introduced since 2011. Successful players were invited to the Superseries Finals, which were held at the end of each year.

Men's doubles

  BWF Superseries Finals tournament
  BWF Superseries Premier tournament
  BWF Superseries tournament

BWF Grand Prix 
The BWF Grand Prix had two levels, the Grand Prix and Grand Prix Gold. It was a series of badminton tournaments sanctioned by the Badminton World Federation (BWF) and played between 2007 and 2017. The World Badminton Grand Prix was sanctioned by the International Badminton Federation from 1983 to 2006.

Men's doubles

  BWF Grand Prix Gold tournament
  BWF & IBF Grand Prix tournament

Personal life
Cai Yun married synchronised swimmer Wang Na in 2010. Wang Na gave birth to a daughter in 2012, and to a second child in probably late 2014. (Cai Yun's doubles partner-turned-coach Zhang Jun married Wang Na's teammate Hu Ni in 2006.)

References

External links
 
  Cai Yun's Blog
 Profile – Beijing 2008 Olympic Games

1980 births
Living people
Sportspeople from Suzhou
Badminton players from Jiangsu
Chinese male badminton players
Badminton players at the 2004 Summer Olympics
Badminton players at the 2008 Summer Olympics
Badminton players at the 2012 Summer Olympics
Olympic badminton players of China
Olympic gold medalists for China
Olympic silver medalists for China
Olympic medalists in badminton
Medalists at the 2008 Summer Olympics
Medalists at the 2012 Summer Olympics
Badminton players at the 2006 Asian Games
Badminton players at the 2010 Asian Games
Badminton players at the 2014 Asian Games
Asian Games gold medalists for China
Asian Games silver medalists for China
Asian Games medalists in badminton
Medalists at the 2006 Asian Games
Medalists at the 2010 Asian Games
Medalists at the 2014 Asian Games
World No. 1 badminton players
BWF Best Male Player of the Year
Nanjing Sport Institute alumni